Sham Siahan (also Romanized as Sham Sīāhān) is a village in Surak Rural District, Lirdaf District, Jask County, Hormozgan Province, Iran. At the 2006 census, its population was 64, in 20 families.

References 

Populated places in Jask County